Gruppenbach is a river of Baden-Württemberg, Germany. It is a right tributary of the Schozach at Auenstein, a part of the municipality of Ilsfeld.

See also

List of rivers of Baden-Württemberg

References

Rivers of Baden-Württemberg
Rivers of Germany